The World Athletics Cross Country Permit Meetings were an annual series of independently-run cross country running competitions which were recognised by the International Association of Athletics Federations (IAAF) with permit status. First held in 1999, the meetings could be used to gain qualification to the IAAF World Cross Country Championships. The number of legs in the series varied from around six to twelve meetings per year, with dates spanning the European winter months, from November to February, prior to the World Championships scheduled in March. The series replaced the IAAF World Cross Challenge, which was first held in 1990. The last series was held in 2020–2021, after which point it was replaced by the three-tier World Athletics Cross Country Tour.

Meetings

References

Recurring sporting events established in 1999
Cross country running competitions
Annual athletics series
Cross Country Permit Meetings